Hawaiian may refer to:

 Native Hawaiians, the current term for the indigenous people of the Hawaiian Islands or their descendants
 Hawaii state residents, regardless of ancestry (only used outside of Hawaii)
 Hawaiian language

Historic uses
 things and people of the Kingdom of Hawaii, during the period from 1795 to 1893
 things and people of the Republic of Hawaii, the short period between the overthrow of the monarchy and U.S. annexation
 things and people of the Territory of Hawaii, during the period the area was a U.S. territory from 1898 to 1959
 things and people of the Sandwich Islands, the name used for the Hawaiian Islands around the end of the 18th century

Other uses
 Hawaiian Airlines, a commercial airline based in Hawaii
 Hawaiian pizza, a style of pizza topped with pineapple

See also 
 Hawaiians (disambiguation)
 Hawaiian cuisine (disambiguation)
 Hawaiian Islands
 Hawaiian kinship
 

Language and nationality disambiguation pages